The Americas Zone was one of the three zones of the regional Davis Cup competition in 1995.

In the Americas Zone there were three different tiers, called groups, in which teams competed against each other to advance to the upper tier. Winners in Group I advanced to the World Group Qualifying Round, along with losing teams from the World Group first round. Teams who lost their respective ties competed in the relegation play-offs, with winning teams remaining in Group I, whereas teams who lost their play-offs were relegated to the Americas Zone Group II in 1996.

Participating nations

Draw

 relegated to Group II in 1996.
 and  advance to World Group Qualifying Round.

First round

Venezuela vs. Uruguay

Argentina vs. Chile

Brazil vs. Bahamas

Mexico vs. Peru

Second round

Venezuela vs. Argentina

Mexico vs. Brazil

First round relegation play-offs

Chile vs. Uruguay

Peru vs. Bahamas

Second round relegation play-offs

Peru vs. Uruguay

References

External links
Davis Cup official website

Davis Cup Americas Zone
Americas Zone Group I